The following radio stations broadcast on AM frequency 1620 kHz: 1620 AM is a Regional broadcast frequency.

Argentina 
 Italia in Villa Martelli, Buenos Aires
 Mitre Cañada de Gómez in Cañada de Gómez, Santa Fe
 Sentires in Merlo

Australia 
 1RF in Canberra, ACT
 2KM in Sydney, NSW
 2RF in Eden, NSW
 2RF in Wagga Wagga, NSW
 4KZ in Taylors Beach, QLD (relays 4KZ in Innisfail, QLD)
 4BRZ in Toowoomba, QLD
 Italian Media Group - in Brisbane, QLD
 6?? in Perth, WA
 NTC Radio in Hobart, TAS

Japan 
 Highway advisory radio

Mexico 
XECSCGU-AM in Guachochi, Chihuahua
XECSIA-AM in Pátzcuaro, Michoacán

United States 
All stations operate with 10 kW during the daytime and 1 kW at nighttime and are Class B stations.

References

External links
 Radio Locator list of stations on 1620

Lists of radio stations by frequency